Zhongli Mo (died 201 BC) was a military general who served the warlord Xiang Yu during the Chu–Han Contention (206–202 BC), a power struggle between Xiang Yu and Liu Bang (Emperor Gao), the founder of the Han dynasty. His name is sometimes incorrectly written and pronounced as "Zhongli Mei" (鍾離昧 or 鍾離眛).

Rebelling against the Qin dynasty
Zhongli Mo was from Yilu Village (in present-day Guanyun County, Lianyungang, Jiangsu). He joined Xiang Liang's rebel force in around 208 BC when uprisings erupted throughout China to overthrow the Qin dynasty. Initially a common soldier, he was later promoted to the rank of general for his outstanding bravery and prowess on the battlefield. After Xiang Liang was killed in action at the Battle of Dingtao in late 208 BC, Zhongli Mo continued to serve Xiang Liang's nephew, Xiang Yu, and became one of Xiang Yu's two most important subordinates, along with Long Ju.

Zhongli Mo was a close friend of Han Xin, then serving as a low-ranking soldier in Xiang Yu's army. Zhongli Mo noticed Han Xin's talent and often recommended Han Xin to Xiang Yu, asking Xiang to promote Han to higher ranks, but Xiang disagreed with Zhongli's view and did not put Han in high regard. Han Xin left Xiang Yu later and defected over Xiang Yu's rival, Liu Bang. Han Xin's talent was recognised by Liu Bang and he was appointed by Liu as a general.

Chu–Han Contention

Following the collapse of the Qin dynasty in 207 BC, Xiang Yu and Liu Bang began to engage in a power struggle for supremacy over China, historically known as the Chu–Han Contention. Xiang Yu initially had an advantage over Liu Bang in terms of military strength, but gradually lost popularity and the tide turned in favour of Liu by 203 BC. Xiang Yu fell for a ruse by Liu Bang's strategist Chen Ping and began to doubt Zhongli Mo's loyalty towards him.

Seeing that his lord no longer trusted him as before, Zhongli Mo left Xiang Yu's camp during the Battle of Gaixia, and Xiang lost the battle and committed suicide after his defeat. Liu Bang emerged victorious in the Chu–Han Contention and unified China under his rule. He was proclaimed "Emperor" and he established the Han dynasty.

Death
In the meantime, Han Xin was conferred the title of "King of Chu" and was granted a vassal kingdom by Liu Bang in recognition of his contributions to the founding of the Han dynasty. Zhongli Mo became a fugitive, wanted by the Han government, and he went to join Han Xin to evade arrest. Han Xin accepted Zhongli Mo and protected him from being captured. When Liu Bang heard that Zhongli Mo had escaped and was hiding in Han Xin's house, he ordered Han to arrest Zhongli, but Han defied the order.

In 201 BC, Liu Bang heard rumours that Han Xin was planning to rebel against him and intended to lead his army to attack Han. Chen Ping suggested to Liu Bang to take Han Xin by surprise instead, by disguising the attack on Han's domain as an inspection tour. One of Han Xin's followers suggested to him to capture Zhongli Mo and present him to the emperor to prove his innocence, but Han refused. Zhongli Mo told Han Xin later that both of them would die if Han captured him and presented him to the emperor, because the emperor already had suspicions about Han's loyalty. Han Xin refused to listen and Zhongli Mo committed suicide in anger. Han Xin brought Zhongli Mo's head to meet Liu Bang later, and the emperor had Han Xin arrested on charges of treason. Although Liu Bang released him later, Han Xin was still demoted to the rank of "Marquis of Huaiyin" and was eventually executed on charges of treason by Empress Lü Zhi.

Notes

References

 Ban Gu et al. Book of Han, Volume 34.

201 BC deaths
Chu–Han contention people
Year of birth unknown
Suicides by sharp instrument in China